Samuel Linford Moyer (April 19, 1879 – September 9, 1951)  was an American football coach.  He served as the head football coach at Franklin & Marshall College in Lancaster, Pennsylvania. He held that position for the 1906 season.  His coaching record at Franklin & Marshall was 3–5–1.

Head coaching record

References

1879 births
1951 deaths
Franklin & Marshall Diplomats football coaches